François Levantal (born 14 October 1960) is a French actor. He has appeared in more than one hundred films since 1986.

Filmography

Theater

Music videos

External links 
 

1960 births
Living people
French male film actors
Male actors from Paris